Harry Challstorp (7 February 1884 – 17 October 1961) was a Swedish wrestler. He competed in two events at the 1908 Summer Olympics.

References

External links
 

1884 births
1961 deaths
Swedish male sport wrestlers
Olympic wrestlers of Sweden
Wrestlers at the 1908 Summer Olympics
People from Tanum Municipality
Sportspeople from Västra Götaland County